Beverley Mill, also known as Chapman Mill, is a historic grist mill located north of Interstate 66 and Virginia State Route 55 in Thoroughfare Gap near Broad Run, Virginia, straddling the county line between Prince William and Fauquier Counties. It was built about 1759, and is a five-story, four bay by three bay, rubble stone structure. The water power was provided by Broad Run which, in its  passage through the Gap, drops . Exterior mill machinery included a  metal waterwheel and sluice gate as well as a stone mill race.  The mill continued in operation through World War II. It is included in the Thoroughfare Gap Battlefield.

The mill was added to the National Register of Historic Places in 1972. On October 22, 1998, a fire resulting from vandalism gutted the mill, which is awaiting restoration.

See also
National Register of Historic Places listings in Prince William County, Virginia
National Register of Historic Places listings in Fauquier County, Virginia

References

External links

Chapman/Beverly Mill Historic Site at Thoroughfare Gap: Turn The Mill Around Campaign
Beverley's Mill, State Route 55, Haymarket, Prince William County, VA: 1 photo at Historic American Buildings Survey

Historic American Buildings Survey in Virginia
Grinding mills on the National Register of Historic Places in Virginia
Industrial buildings completed in 1759
Buildings and structures in Prince William County, Virginia
National Register of Historic Places in Prince William County, Virginia
Buildings and structures in Fauquier County, Virginia
National Register of Historic Places in Fauquier County, Virginia
Grinding mills in Virginia
Individually listed contributing properties to historic districts on the National Register in Virginia